Stranger Than Fiction: True Stories (published in the United Kingdom & Australia as Nonfiction) is a non-fiction book by Chuck Palahniuk, published in 2004. It is a collection of essays, stories, and interviews written for various magazines and newspapers. Some of the pieces had also been previously published on the internet. The book is divided into three sections: "People Together", articles about people who find unique ways of achieving togetherness; "Portraits", interviews and short essays mostly about famous people; and "Personal", autobiographical pieces.

An abridged audiobook version read by the author was released at the same time as the print edition. An unabridged version co-read by Dennis Boutsikaris was released later.

Editions
  (hardcover, 2004)
  (audiobook CD, 2004)
  (audiobook cassette, 2004)
  (paperback, 2005)

See also
Fugitives and Refugees: A Walk in Portland, Oregon, Palahniuk's other non-fiction work.

External links
Stranger Than Fiction: True Stories official web site
An audio sample of the book read by the author from Random House

2004 non-fiction books
American anthologies
Books by Chuck Palahniuk
Doubleday (publisher) books
Books with cover art by Rodrigo Corral